The Friedberger Ach is a river in Bavaria, Germany. It is a right tributary of the Danube. Its source is in the village Untermühlhausen, northeast of Landsberg am Lech. For most of its length it flows parallel to the river Lech at only a few km distance. Towns along the Friedberger Ach include Weil, Prittriching, Mering, Friedberg, Rehling, Thierhaupten and Rain. After Rain, the Friedberger Ach flows east, parallel to the Danube, and joins the Danube near Oberhausen.

References

Rivers of Bavaria
Tributaries of the Danube
Rivers of Germany